The Hall City Cave is a limestone cave system near Hayfork, California, United States. Exploration was documented in 1903, with a Permian age ammonite fossil discovered.

A cavern in the Hall City Cave contains a deep shaft of water.

The Hall City Cave was a sacred place for the Nor-el-muk and other Wintu Native Americans. Edith Van Allen Murphy interviewed a long-surviving Wintu woman named Lucy; the papers are kept at the Held-Poage Museum in Ukiah, California in the Estle Beard Notes, box 2, Notebook g, p 15

Treasure 
The cave is purported to contain a treasure consisting of $40,000 in gold.  The story goes that two miners carrying the gold were ambushed and murdered by two natives.  The natives were tracked down by a posse who demanded to be told the location of the gold.  The natives stated that they had dropped the gold in a water-filled shaft at the back of the cave.  However, there appears to be no newspaper reports of this particular ambush and murders, though there is a report of two miners being murdered and the gold being buried on one of the river flats of the upper Trinity River.

In 2012, a DIY open-source remotely operated vehicle (OpenROV) was used to explore the shaft.

References

External links
 Coordinates: 
 Remotely Operated Vehicle exploration by OpenROV
 Cave diving the Hall City Cave by Dave McCracken

Caves of California
Landforms of Trinity County, California
Limestone caves
Religious places of the indigenous peoples of North America
Wintun